No Far Away is the first studio album by contemporary Christian musician Chris August. It was released on August 24, 2010 through Fervent Records, and produced by Chris August and Ed Cash.  The album made it up to No. 1 on the Top Heatseekers list of Billboard Magazine and No. 7 on the Christian Albums chart.

Singles
The album has had three singles released. The first single, "Starry Night", was the best performing song, finishing atop the Hot Christian Songs and Christian AC chart Billboard charts. The second single, "7x70", finished at No. 7 on the Hot Christian Songs chart. "Battle", the third single, peaked at No. 23 on the Hot Christian Songs chart.

Reception

Critical

CCM Magazine'''s Andy Argyrakis said that "his songwriting evokes a meditative sophistication".

Christian Music Zine's Tyler Hess said that "it's one of those albums that has you belting out the chorus, wishing you were driving solo in your car with one song, while during another song has you thinking completely about the LORD and who He is."

Cross Rhythms' Stephen Luff wrote that "It's hard to find favourites as this album is simply outstanding. It is a bit of a slow burner, but once it gets under your skin, it does not let go."

Jesus Freak Hideout's Kevin Chamberlin said that "While No Far Away isn't bad, several of the tracks lose their appeal due to their over polished presentation." In addition, Chamberlin wrote that "his voice wraps No Far Away on a strong note as the sound of triumph returns."

Jesus Freak Hideout's Jen Rose said that "Unfortunately, No Far Away suffers at times from the over-produced 'Nashville sound,'" and it is "A shame really, because when the songs are stripped to their essence, August's talent really shines through. Because of this, the album turns out to be both mixed effort and a promising debut." Furthermore, Rose wrote that "No Far Away'' weaves shimmering pop-rock melodies with a singer-writer's lyrical sensibilities and a smooth, unique voice. At its best, the eleven-song collection draws inspiration from soulful pop artists like Stevie Wonder and Gavin DeGraw"

Track listing

Charts

References

External links
Chris August official music page

2010 albums
Chris August albums
Fervent Records albums